Achlya conspicua is a plant pathogen, including of rice seedlings.

References

External links 
 Index Fungorum
 USDA ARS Fungal Database

Water mould plant pathogens and diseases
Species described in 1923
Saprolegniales